Kunovice is a town in the Uherské Hradiště District in the Zlín Region of the Czech Republic. It has about 5,500 inhabitants.

Geography
Kunovice forms a conurbation with neighbouring Uherské Hradiště. It lies on the border between the Vizovice Highlands and Lower Morava Valley. The Olšava River flows through the town and flows into the Morava, which forms the northern border of the territory.

History

The first written mention of Kunovice is from 1196. From the 15th century Kunovice was referred to as a market town.

Until 1918, Kunowitz – Kunovice was part of the Austrian monarchy (Austria side after the compromise of 1867), in the Ungarisch Hradisch – Uherské Hradiště District, one of the 34 Bezirkshauptmannschaften in Moravia.

In the 1930s, Kunovice began to transform from an agriculture community to an industrial one. In 1949–1954 and 1972–1990 Kunovice was a part of Uherské Hradiště. Kunovice gained the town status in 1997.

Demographics

Economy
Since 1936, the aircraft manufacturer Aircraft Industries (formerly Let Kunovice) has been based at Kunovice Airport near the town. The airport also hosts aircraft manufacturers Czech Sport Aircraft and Evektor-Aerotechnik. It is designated as a private international airport.

The largest Czech producer of refrigerated and durable food, Hamé s.r.o. company owned by the Orkla ASA conglomerate, has its headquarters in Kunovice.

Sights
The main tourist attraction is the Kunovice Aviation Museum, located at the town's airport. It was founded in 1970.

Notable people
Anton Gala (1891–1977), Slovak scientist, ophthalmologist and university professor
Jan Hrubý (1915–1942), a soldier who took part in Assassination of Reinhard Heydrich
Josef Abrhám (1939–2022), actor; grew up here

Twin towns – sister cities

Kunovice is twinned with:
 Pocheon, South Korea
 Stará Turá, Slovakia
 West, United States

References

External links

Aircraft Industries company

Cities and towns in the Czech Republic
Populated places in Uherské Hradiště District